Gustavo Kuerten won the title, defeating Mariano Puerta 7–6(7–3), 6–3 in the final.

Seeds

  Gustavo Kuerten (champion)
  Marcelo Ríos (first round)
  Fernando Meligeni (first round, retired)
  Fernando Vicente (quarterfinals)
  Franco Squillari (first round)
  Arnaud di Pasquale (first round)
  Sargis Sargsian (first round)
  Gastón Gaudio (semifinals)

Draw

Finals

Top half

Bottom half

External links
 Singles draw

Singles
2000 in Chilean tennis